SM UB-46 was a Type UB II submarine or U-boat for the German Imperial Navy during World War I. UB-46 operated in the Mediterranean and the Black Seas, and was sunk by a mine in December 1916.

UB-46 was ordered in July 1915 and was laid down at the AG Weser shipyard in Bremen in September. She was equipped to carry a complement of four torpedoes for her two bow torpedo tubes and had an  deck gun. As part of a group of six submarines selected for Mediterranean service, UB-46 was broken into railcar sized components and shipped to Pola where she was assembled and launched in May 1916, and commissioned in June.

In early December 1916, during the submarine's fifth patrol, UB-46 struck a mine in the Black Sea a short distance from the north entrance to the Bosphorus and sank with all hands.

Design and construction 
The German UB II design improved upon the design of the UB I boats, which had been ordered in September 1914. In service, the UB I boats were found to be too small and too slow. A major problem was that, because they had a single propeller shaft/engine combo, if either component failed, the U-boat became almost totally disabled. To rectify this flaw, the UB II boats featured twin propeller shafts and twin engines (one shaft for each engine), which also increased the U-boat's top speed. The new design also included more powerful batteries, larger torpedo tubes, and a deck gun. As a UB II boat, U-47 could also carry twice the torpedo load of her UB I counterparts, and nearly ten times as much fuel. To contain all of these changes the hull was larger, and the surface and submerged displacement was more than double that of the UB I boats.

She had a single hull with saddle tanks and had a draught of  when surfaced. She displaced  while submerged but only  on the surface.

The submarine was equipped with twin Daimler diesel engines and twin Siemens-Schuckert electric motors—for surfaced and submerged running, respectively. Her electric motors and batteries provided a range of at  while submerged.

UB-46 was equipped with two  bow torpedo tubes and could carry four torpedoes. The U-boat was also armed with one  Uk L/30 deck gun.

UB-46 was laid down by AG Weser at its Bremen shipyard on 4 September 1915. As one of six U-boats selected for service in the Mediterranean while under construction, UB-46 was broken into railcar-sized components and shipped overland to the Austro-Hungarian port of Pola. Shipyard workers from Weser assembled the boat and her five sisters at Pola, where she was launched on 17 June.

Service career 
SM UB-46 was commissioned into the German Imperial Navy on 12 June 1916 under the command of Oberleutnant zur See Cäsar Bauer. UB-46, Bauer's third U-boat command, was assigned to the Navy's Pola Flotilla. Although the flotilla was based in Pola, the site of the main Austro-Hungarian Navy base, boats of the flotilla operated out of the Austro-Hungarian base at Cattaro which was located farther south and closer to the Mediterranean. German U-boats typically returned to Pola only for repairs. After a month at the helm of UB-46, Bauer was promoted to Kapitänleutnant.

On 2 August, Bauer achieved his first success in command of UB-46 when the Japanese steamer Kohina Maru was sunk off Alexandria just short of her destination of Port Said. A week later the U-boat sank the Greek sailing vessel Basileios which was headed back to the Adriatic from Egypt. On 2 October, Bauer torpedoed Huntsfall which was carrying hay to Salonica, and took the ship's master prisoner. The  British steamer was the largest ship sunk by UB-46.

After Germany's conquest of Romania (see Romania during World War I), the German Imperial Navy had sufficient fuel oil for submarines located in the Black Sea. UB-46 and three of her sister ships in the Pola Flotilla were ordered to Constantinople and, en route, had to navigate through the Dardanelles, which had been heavily mined by the Allies in the middle of 1916. UB-46 joined the Constantinople Flotilla on 7 October.

The German submarines in the Black Sea accomplished little, sinking only six ships between August and the end of the year. UB-46 sank one of the six ships when she sent down the 116 GRT Russian ship Melanie north of Cape Tarkhan on 7 November. Melanie was the last ship sunk by UB-46. By early December, UB-46 was based out of Varna, Bulgaria.

Fate 
The vessel's entire complement (reported by Helgason as 20) perished in the sinking.

A  portion of the wreck comprising the forward section of the torpedo room and battery compartment was located in 1993 during coal extraction operations and was salvaged by the Turkish navy; the remainder of the vessel could not be located. She was put on display in an outdoor exhibit at the Turkish Naval Museum in Istanbul. The wreckage was transferred to the Dardanelles Naval Museum at Çanakkale in 2008, where the remains of the vessel are currently on display.

Summary of raiding history

Notes

References

Bibliography 

 

 
 
 
 
 
 
 
 

German Type UB II submarines
U-boats commissioned in 1916
World War I submarines of Germany
Maritime incidents in 1916
U-boats sunk in 1916
U-boats sunk by mines
World War I shipwrecks in the Black Sea
Ships preserved in museums
1916 ships
Ships lost with all hands